Oddendale is a hamlet in Cumbria, England, near the large village of Shap. For transport there is the M6 motorway and the A6 road.

History

Oddendale stone circle

Oddendale has a stone circle nearby,, part of the complex of cairns, stone circles and standing stones that includes the 'Shap Stone Avenue' of monuments. The site has benefitted from an extensive and relatively recent (1997) excavation that revealed various stages in the monument's history: firstly, two concentric circles of oak wooden posts (dating to the Neolithic, c. 2,872–2,350 BC); followed by their removal and replacement with stone cappings of pink granite; followed by an Early Bronze Age ring cairn built over the inner circle surfaced with blue/gray stones and yellow/white pieces of flat limestone, with cremated bone, pottery and other 'token' grave goods; and then a fourth stage which saw the addition of a pink granite platform on to the side of the cairn, which itself had a kerb of red stones around it.

The colouring of the stones may have had ritualistic significance. The replacement of the wooden circles by stone ones is a feature shared with some other monuments and may represent the replacement of concern for the living (and the Sun) by devotion to the dead (and the Moon or Sunset).

See also

Listed buildings in Crosby Ravensworth

References

External links

The Megalithic Portal: Oddendale
The Modern Antiquarian: Oddendale
http://www.british-towns.net/cy/level_4_display.asp?GetL3=16604

Hamlets in Cumbria
Crosby Ravensworth
Archaeological sites in Cumbria
Stone circles in Cumbria